Amiriyeh (also Romanized as Amīrīyeh; also known as Amria) is a village in Razan Rural District, in the Central District of Razan County, Hamadan Province, Iran. At the 2006 census, its population was 293, in 72 families.

References 

Populated places in Razan County